The Economy Act of 1932 is an Act of Congress that established the purchasing authority of the federal government. Title VI of this earlier act authorized heads of executive departments, establishments, bureaus, and offices to place orders with any other such Federal agency unless the requisitioned goods or services could be acquired as conveniently or more cheaply from the private sector.
It was signed in the final days of the Herbert Hoover administration in February 1933.

Section 213 

Section 213 of the Economy Act of 1932 was controversial because it required the government to fire one member of each married couple working in government. The original bill called for the dismissal of wives over husbands, however the text of the bill was changed before finalization due to “fear, on the part of legislators, of the political effect, if discrimination against women were otherwise so clearly and forcibly shown.” The wife's salary was characterized as “pin money” by Frances Perkins, New York's Commissioner of Labor, who said, "“The woman ‘pin-money worker’ who competes with the necessity worker is a menace to society, a selfish, shortsighted creature, who ought to be ashamed of herself...Until we have every woman in this community earning a living wage...I am not willing to encourage those who are under no economic necessities to compete with their charm and education, their superior advantages, against the working girl who has only her two hands.” 

The National Woman's Party engaged in a campaign to repeal the law.
Section 213 was repealed on July 26, 1937.

References

External links 
 Economy Act, law.cornell

1932 in law
72nd United States Congress